Larinopoda lagyra, the white pierid blue, is a butterfly in the family Lycaenidae. It is found in Nigeria (the Cross River loop), Cameroon, Gabon, the Republic of the Congo, the Democratic Republic of the Congo and Uganda. The habitat consists of forests.

Subspecies
Larinopoda lagyra lagyra (south-eastern Nigeria, Cameroon, Gabon, Uganda: west to the Bwamba Valley, Democratic Republic of the Congo: Mongala, Uele, North Kivu, Tshuapa, Equateur and Sankuru)
Larinopoda lagyra reducta Berger, 1981 (Democratic Republic of the Congo: Lualaba)

References

Butterflies described in 1866
Poritiinae
Butterflies of Africa
Taxa named by William Chapman Hewitson